Manola is a hamlet in central Alberta within the County of Barrhead No. 11, located  south of Highway 18, approximately  northwest of St. Albert.

Demographics 
Manola recorded a population of 29 in the 1991 Census of Population conducted by Statistics Canada.

See also 
List of communities in Alberta
List of hamlets in Alberta

References 

County of Barrhead No. 11
Hamlets in Alberta